Another Story is the second and final album by the Scottish band Fiction Factory. It was released in 1985. The album was a commercial failure and featured no hit singles, despite the release of three singles the same year; "Not the Only One", "No Time" and "Standing at the Top of the World".

Background
Following the commercial disappointment of the band's 1984 debut album Throw the Warped Wheel Out, the band underwent a major change in personnel, as members keyboardist and writer Eddie Jordan, drummer Mike Ogletree and bassist Graham McGregor left the band. These departures left lead vocalist Kevin Patterson and guitarist Chic Medley as the two remaining members, who in turn hired guest musicians for the recording of the second Fiction Factory album, including keyboardist Paul Wishart, guitarist Pim Jones, percussionist James Locke and bass player Graham Weir. Medley produced the album, with Patterson as assistant producer, and both wrote the entire album's worth of material either together or solely (except "Lose Your Heart in Nature" which was credited also to Wishart). The album was recorded at The Planet, Castle Sound and Amazon Studios, Liverpool, while it was mixed at Castle Sound and Amazon Studios. It was mastered at Ham Audio. Another Story was released in 1985.

The album spawned three singles; "Not the Only One", "No Time" and "Standing on Top of the World". The closing track "Victoria Victorious" featured Fiona Carlin on lead vocals. All singles from the album received very limited promotion, with no music videos being made, nor any TV appearances featuring the band performing the material, except for one performance of "Not the Only One" on the German show Musik Convoy in May 1985. The band did perform a small number of UK concerts to promote the release of the album.

Shortly following the commercial failure of the album, Fiction Factory disbanded. After this, Medley worked on various musical projects and with numerous bands, while Patterson became briefly involved as a music producer before leaving the music industry to being working in the IT department at the University of Dundee. Aside from the lack of commercial success, Fiction Factory also felt they never managed to create something that was as good as "(Feels Like) Heaven", and that all they did was measured against it. Patterson later recalled: "We could never shake that one song." Years later, Patterson also stated in an interview that he wanted to record "Another Story" as an end to the band as he had had enough of music, living with stress and constantly writing songs, so he disbanded the group.

In 2007 the band briefly reunited, only consisting of Patterson and Jordan to perform "(Feels Like) Heaven" with a backing band at Jordan's wedding in August 2007. In 2011, the original band reunited to play live at the Rewind Festival.

Release
The album was released in Europe only and did not feature an American release. In Europe, the album was released through Foundry Recordings/Virgin Records, however in Germany the album was issued via Instant Records. For some versions of the album, marketing was handled by RCA Records (RCA Schallplatten GmbH), others both marketing and distribution was handled by Line Music GmbH. The album soon became out of print. Another Story was only released as a vinyl LP, except in Germany where Instant Records gave a limited pressing on CD. The CD release also became out of print and today is a collectors item, often selling for prices up to £500.

The CD version of Another Story featured two bonus tracks; "Not the Only One (Long Version)", which was the "Extended Mix" found on the 12" vinyl version of the "Not the Only One" single and "Let Me Be a Part", which was the "Not the Only One" b-side. Although both bonus tracks aren't listed on the album's back insert, they are listed on the disc.

For the majority of the album's editions, the artwork featured a purple-like background colour, however the artwork was changed for some editions and used a blue background colour instead, although the design otherwise remained the same. It is reported that the album's backing vocalist Marwenna Laidlaw is the woman posing on the front cover of the album. The photography was created by David McIntyre, who had also done the band's debut album. The sleeve was designed by myIDEA. The picture was taken in McIntyre's apartment in London. Patterson later recalled "We just asked David to come up with an interesting picture (which he did in his flat in London). We did not give him any ideas and we did not see what he was doing... he just presented it to us when he had finished."

Singles
"Not the Only One", the lead single from Another Story, was released in Europe, mainly the UK, Germany and Italy via Foundry Records as well as Canada via Virgin Records. It was issued on both 7" and 12" vinyl, with the 12" vinyl featuring an extended version of the song (titled "Extended Mix", but known as "Long Version" on the Another Story CD), and "Not the Only One ('Mix' Mix)", a remix which most notably removed all lead vocal.

The single "No Time" was released in the UK only via Foundry Records on both 7" and 12" vinyl. The single featured the exclusive b-side "Tension" however this track was not included as a bonus on the CD release of Another Story. The 12" vinyl release would feature extended versions of both the A-side and the B-side.

"Standing at the Top of the World" was released on 7" vinyl via Foundry Records and Centre Records in Australia only. "Not the Only One" was the B-Side.

Critical reception

On its release, Andy Strickland of Record Mirror described the album as "an unspectacular affair" and "one of those slick, dull works that seem to appeal to balding A&R men and nobody else". He added, "Fiction Factory are trying to capture the old ABC sound and feel, but they fail miserably. 'Contractual Obligation', somebody whispers. I concur." He picked "Victoria Victorious" as the album's best track, "largely because of the great vocal hauntingly delivered by Fiona Carlin". Donald McRae of New Musical Express wrote, "Another Story is an example of the kind of product which is designed to blend in with the quivering nuances of an intimate sunset gathering. Fiction Factory play music for young and sensitive ideal home owners who suspect Dire Straits of being crazed petrol-sniffing existentialists."

Track listing

Personnel 
 Kevin Patterson - lead vocals, performer, assistant producer, engineer, programming
 Chic Medley - guitar, performer, producer, engineer, programming
 Marwenna Laidlaw - backing vocals
 Graham Weir - brass
 Pim Jones - guitar
 Paul Wishart - keyboards
 Fiona Carlin - lead vocals on "Victoria Victorious"
 James Locke - percussion
 Pete Coleman - engineer
 HA (Peter Harenberg) - mastering
 Gordian Troeller, Steve Baker - management
 David McIntyre - photography
 myIDEA - sleeve design

References

1985 albums
Fiction Factory albums